Walter Jean Kolarz (26 April 1912 - 21 July 1962) was a British-based scholar of the communist world who wrote widely on ethnic and religious issues.

Kolarz was born in Teplitz-Schonau, Kingdom of Bohemia, Austro-Hungarian Empire. He studied at Charles University in Prague, then moved to Berlin to work as a journalist. However, he was expelled by the Nazis in 1936. He moved to Paris, before fleeing to London in 1940.

Kolarz worked as a journalist for United Press of America, before joining the BBC in 1949, specialising as an analyst on Soviet and East European affairs.

Kolarz married Alexandra Lipovsky in 1939 (she died in March 2000) and they had one son.

Kolarz died in hospital in Kensington, London, on 21 July 1962.

A number of Kolarz' books were compiled by others in the wake of his early death.

Books
Stalin and Eternal Russia, 1944
Myths and Realities in Eastern Europe, 1946
Russia and Her Colonies. Frederick A. Praeger, New York. 1952
How Russia is Ruled, 1953
The Peoples of the Soviet Far East, 1954
Religion in the Soviet Union, 1961
Religion and Communism in Africa, 1963

External links
The Times, obituary 23 July 1962
Alexandra Kolarz's Obituary, "The Guardian", 31 March, 2000

1912 births
1962 deaths
Czechoslovak journalists
Russian studies scholars
Charles University alumni
Czechoslovak emigrants to the United Kingdom